Together is the fourth country studio album by The Oak Ridge Boys, released in 1980.

Track listing

Personnel

The Oak Ridge Boys
Duane Allen - lead vocals
Joe Bonsall - tenor vocals
William Lee Golden - baritone vocals
Richard Sterban - bass vocals

Additional Musicians
Jimmy Capps, Bobby Thompson, Chip Young - acoustic guitar
Joe Osborn, Jack Williams - bass guitar
Kenny Buttrey - drums
Billy Sanford, Reggie Young - electric guitar
Buddy Spicher - fiddle
Ron Oates - keyboards
Weldon Myrick - steel guitar
George Binkley III, John Catchings, Marvin Chantry, Roy Christensen, Carl Gorodetzky, Sheldon Kurland, Wilfred Lehmann, Dennis Molchan, Samuel Terranova, Gary Vanosdale, Stephanie Woolf - strings
Bergen White - string arrangements

Chart performance

Album

Singles

The Oak Ridge Boys albums
1980 albums
MCA Records albums
Albums produced by Ron Chancey